The Allegory of Good and Bad Government is a series of three fresco panels painted by Ambrogio Lorenzetti between February 1338 and May 1339. The paintings are located in Siena's Palazzo Pubblico—specifically in the Sala dei Nove ("Salon of Nine"), the council hall of the Republic of Siena's nine executive magistrates, elected officials who performed executive functions (and judicial ones in secular matters). The paintings have been construed as being "designed to remind the Nine [magistrates] of just how much was at stake as they made their decisions".

Considered Lorenzetti's "undisputed masterpiece", the series consists of six different scenes (the titles are all modern conveniences):

 Allegory of Good Government
 Allegory of Bad Government
 Effects of Bad Government in the City
 Effects of Bad Government in the Country
 Effects of Good Government in the City
 Effects of Good Government in the Country

Historical context
The Allegory and Effects of Good and Bad Government series was commissioned entirely by a civic group, the Council of Nine (the city council). Unlike most art at the time, the subject matter is civic rather than religious. The Republic of Siena was one of the most powerful of the fourteenth-century Italian city-states, an urban hub filled with bankers and merchants with many international contacts. The fourteenth century was a turbulent time for politics in the Italian cities due to constant violent party struggles; governments were overthrown, and governments were reinstated.

Layout
The murals occupy an extensive amount of space, covering three of the four walls of the Council Room. The only wall that does not have a mural is the southern wall, as this wall contains the only window of the room. The door through which the council would enter is found on the opposite northern wall. On the eastern wall, Lorenzetti depicted the scenes of the Effects of Good Government, while opposite on the western wall he depicted The Allegory and Effects of Bad Government. Overlooking both these murals, the personifications of the allegorical depictions of the virtues of good government are found on the northern wall.

Allegory of Good Government

In the Allegory of Good Government, the composition is built up from three horizontal bands. In the foreground the figures of contemporary Siena are represented. The citizens act as symbolic representations of the various civic officers and magistrates. They are linked by two woven cords or concords. The concord gathers from under the scales of Justice. Behind them, on a stage, there are allegorical figures in two groups, representing the Good Government. The two groups are connected by the procession of the councilors. The upper band indicates the heavenly sphere with the floating bodiless ghosts of the virtues. Wisdom sits above the head of the personification of the Commune of Siena. He sits upon a throne and holds an orb and scepter, symbolizing temporal power. He is dressed in the colors of the Balzana, the black-and-white Sienese coat of arms. Around his head are the four letters "C S C V", which stand for "Commune Saenorum Civitatis Virginis", which explains his identity as the embodiment of the Siena Council. That character is guided by Faith, Hope, and Charity. He confers with the proper Virtues necessary for a proper and just ruler.

The virtues of Good Government are represented by six crowned, stately female figures: Peace, Fortitude, and Prudence on the left, Magnanimity, Temperance, and Justice on the right. On the far left of the fresco the figure of Justice is repeated as she is balancing the scales held by Wisdom. The figures are naturalistic, and supposedly the female figures represented the ideal of female beauty in Siena. At the feet of the ruler two children are depicted as playing. They could be the sons of Remus, Ascius, and Senius, who, according to Roman legend, are the founders of Siena. It also is believed that the two children are Romulus and Remus, who founded Rome. The text within the lower border of the image reads:
"This holy virtue [Justice], where she rules, induces to unity the many souls [of citizens], and they, gathered together for such a purpose, make the Common Good [ben comune] their Lord; and he, in order to govern his state, chooses never to turn his eyes from the resplendent faces of the Virtues who sit around him. Therefore to him in triumph are offered taxes, tributes, and lordship of towns; therefore, without war, every civic result duly follows—useful necessary, and pleasurable".
Below the fresco is the Lorenzetti's signature: Ambrosius Laurentii De Senis Hic Pinxit Utrinque.

Peaceful City

On the longer wall of the room in the Salla is the fresco The Effects of Good Government in the City and in the Country. Part of that fresco is Peaceful City. This panoramic fresco represents several scenes indicating the life of Siena and her environment in the fourteenth century. This painting provides the first accurate panoramic view of city and country (landscape) since antiquity; viewers can identify the city of Siena, as opposed to ambiguous settings found in other works of the time. The city is filled with clustered palaces, markets, towers, churches, streets, and walls. All of these aspects are reminiscent of town scenes found on ancient Roman murals. There are many shops, indicating good commerce and economic conditions. The traffic moves peacefully, guild members work at their trades, a wedding procession takes place, and maidens can be seen dancing gracefully. Dancers were common for springtime rituals; they also act as a metaphor for peaceful commonwealth in this painting. The young women could also represent the Nine Muses of the arts and sciences from Greek mythology. This fresco shows that if government is virtuous and rules justly, then the city thrives and prospers. There is text along the lower edge of the wall that reads:

"Turn your eyes to behold her, you who are governing, who is portrayed here [Justice], crowned on account of her excellence, who always renders to everyone his due. Look how many goods derive from her and how sweet and peaceful is that life of the city where is preserved this virtue who outshines any other. She guards and defends those who honor her, and nourishes and feeds them. From her light is both requiting those who do good and giving due punishment to the wicked."

Peaceful Country
The fresco then blends effortlessly into Peaceful Country. The transition is made by an entourage passing through the city gate and out to the countryside beyond city walls. The new scene shows a bird's-eye view of the Tuscan countryside, with villas, castles, plowed farmlands, and peasants and farmers leisurely going about their bucolic responsibilities. The landscape is particularized, and with characteristics that indicate a specific place and environment. The winged allegorical figure of Security hovers above the landscape holding an unfurled scroll promising safety to all who live under the rule of law. Written on the scroll is the text:

“Without fear every many may travel freely and each may till and sow, so long as this commune shall maintain this lady [Justice] sovereign, for she has stripped the wicked of all power.”

Cosmic allegories
In the fresco cycle Lorenzetti expresses the idea that the cause of peace lays not only from the effects of good government, but also from the citizens acting in accordance "with the temporal and astral force that governs” them. Lorenzetti expresses this idea in part with the border along the three frescos, which display medallions featuring the personifications of the planets as well as the seasons. Above the mural depicting The Effects of Good Government, these medallions follow the natural order of the seasons and alignment of the planets. In The Effects of Good Government, Lorenzetti shows the citizens completing the different labors for each of these months. The labors belonging to spring and summer are very clear; "fishing and tending to the vines (March), cultivation of the soil and planting (April), riding (May), ploughing and stock rising (June), cereal harvesting (July), threshing (August), and hunting (September)". The labors of winter and fall are also found, but they do not follow the normal conventions of the time for depicting these labors. With these depictions of the labors following with the seasons and planets, Lorenzetti creates the idea that peace is in part possible due to the citizens following in accordance to the planets and seasons. It is also hypothesized that with the depictions of citizens in different labors, Lorenzetti shows the allegorical manifestations of the children of the different planets. Upon closer analysis it is clear that Lorenzetti depicted the children who would help ensure peace, versus those who would be disruptive of it. This can be seen with the emphasis of mercantile activities that were believed to be Mercury's children. For the children of Venus, Lorenzetti chose to show a bride, weavers, and dancers, instead of depicting her more carnal children. The children of Mars, who all depend on the use of weapons, are represented by knights and guards. Saturn's children are represented by ploughmen, diggers and threshers, and excludes his other children, such as cripples. Jupiter's children are represented as hunters. With Lorenzetti emphasizing the children who would ensure peace, he drove home the importance of following activities to foster peace and not disrupt it. With both the depiction of the monthly labors and the children of the various planets, Lorenzetti shows the importance of performing the appropriate tasks in accordance to nature to ensure peace. This point is made stronger by the fact that half the seasons and plants are shown depicted over the scene of war, reminding the viewer the faulty error of not acting in accordance.

Venus and the dancers

The ten dancers featured in the middle of The Effects of Good Government fresco are the subject of many discussions. It is believed that they are the representation of Venus's children. It was believed in Lorenzetti's day that there were two manifestations of Venus. These two sides found their forms in either the legitimate planetary deity, or as the nude goddess born of the sea. When looking at the depictions of the personifications of the other planets along the fresco borders, we see that they are seen placed in both their houses. Venus on the other hand is only placed in Taurus, her daytime house. With this careful choice, Lorenzetti legitimizes her side as a planetary goddess. This is further enforced with her modest dress, instead of being depicted nude. Her children then in turn gain the representation of chastity, matrimonial love, friendship, and sociability, all aspects that flourish during daylight hours. The movement of their dancing mimics the arm movements of Venus, and this in combination with their larger scale, creates and draw emphasis to the resounding message that peace in the city must be found in conjunction with the movements of the Heavens.

Perspective
When examining The Effects of Good Government, the viewer is aware of the use of a skewed perspective. The cityscape and the scale of the figures, as well as the perspective, do not seem to follow a rational scheme. There have been two hypothesizes put forward to explain this departure from a more traditional use of perspective. One hypothesis that has been formulated is that the skewed perspective comes from the fact that the mural derives its perspective from a center directly in front of the figure of Tyranny on the opposite wall. The perspective then in the depiction of good government radiates from this center, making use of a more radial perspective. The second and more popular hypothesis put forward is the idea that the perspective is derived from the gaze line of Justice. This hypothesis is supported by the fact that whereas the other virtues sit in an upright position, looking either into space or discreetly at each other, Justice's line of gaze is directed across to the corner of the room. To further support this idea photographs have been taken following her line of sight, and with these photographs the buildings and figures fall into a correct perspective. Further evidence to provide support of this idea comes with an examination of the science of optics during that time in Siena. In the time of Lorenzetti, the belief was that sight was not only the act of seeing, but of understanding as well. The word for vision meant both to see and the image that the mind created. The word light also had dual meaning, describing "both physical and spiritual illumination". When the viewer is placed into the mindset and understanding of a Sienese citizen of the day, it strengthens the argument that the perspective is from that of Justice, as her gaze then creates and illuminates this peaceful scene.

Disagreements within location
The frescoes of The Effects of Good Government seem to hold one strong point of debate. Whereas some scholars strongly believe that the city depicted is supposed to represent Siena, others believe that it is supposed to be more of metaphor for the city. For both of these arguments scholars take their stance from evidence they find within the fresco. Some scholars take the depiction of the bell tower and the cathedral with its dome to show that this is indeed Siena. They argue that these are depictions of standing Sienese buildings. Others yet look to the right of the countryside depiction to the small scene of the port, which includes the name "Telamon". This inscription is very small, indeed the depiction of the port itself is small. Still though scholars look to this as proof that this scene is meant to accurately depict Siena. Other scholars look to the gate, as well as other buildings, pointing out the severe differences and departures between the fresco and reality. This evidence to them points to the fact that Lorenzetti meant to depict an ideal city, one that the comparison to Siena could not be missed, but was not to be mistaken for Siena.

The Effects of Bad Government

Lorenzetti's The Effects of Bad Government fresco has not been written on so extensively as The Effects of Good Government has been, partly due to the worse condition of this fresco. The wall on which the fresco of The Effects of Bad Government is depicted used to be an exterior wall, so has suffered much moisture damage in the past. When viewers turn to examine this mural, they are confronted with a devious looking figure adorned with horns and fangs, and appearing to be cross-eyed. This figure is identified as Tyrammides (Tyranny), who sits enthroned, resting his feet upon a goat (symbolic of luxury) while holding a dagger.

Below the tyrant the captive figure of Justice lies bound, while the figures of Cruelty, Deceit, Fraud, Fury, Division, and War flank him, and above him float the figures of Avarice, Pride, and Vainglory. These figures, according to an advice book for city magistrates of the time, were considered to be the “leading enemies of human life”. The planets of Jupiter, Saturn, and Mars preside over this scene, as they were the less favorable planets; also included are tyrannical figures such as the Roman Emperor Nero. When looking at the scene of the city itself, it appears to be very jarring; nothing fits as it should be. This is in part to the fact that Lorenzetti presented the scene in such a manner that the viewer must read it right to left, automatically creating a sense of discomfort. When looking at the scene the city appears to be in ruin, windows are wide open, houses are being demolished, and businesses are nonexistent, except that of the armourer. The streets are deserted, and the countryside shows two armies advancing toward each other. The whole scene shows the diametrical opposite of that of The Effects of Good Government, creating a powerful reminder to the council.

Notes

References
 Burke, Suzanne Maureen, Ambrogio Lorenzetti's Sala della Pace: Its Historiography and "Sensus Astrologicus", Ph.D. diss., New York University, 1994
 Campbell, C. Jean. "The City's New CLothes: Ambrogio Lornzetti and the Poetics of Peace." The Art Bulletin 83.2 (2001): 240-58. Print.										
 Carli, Enzo. Sienese Painting. (Greenwich, CT: New York Graphic Society, 1956).
 Cole, Bruce. Sienese Painting in the Age of the Renaissance. (Bloomington: Indiana UP, 1985).
 Frugoni, Chiara. "The Book of Wisdom and Lorenzetti's Fresco in the Palazzo Pubblico at Siena." Journal of the Warburg and Courtauld Institute 43 (1980): 239-41. Print. 	
 Greenstein, Jack M. "The Vision of Peace: Meaning and Representation in Ambrogio Lorenzetti's Sala Della Pace Cityscapes." Art History 11.4 (1988): 492-510. Print.* Jollingsworth, Mary. Art in World History. N.P. 2004
 Hyman, Timothy. Sienese Painting: The Art of a City-republic (1278–1477). New York, NY: Thames & Hudson, 2003. Print.
 Kren, Emil, and Marx, Daniel. “Lorenzetti, Amrbrogio : The Allegory of Good Government.” Web Gallery of Art. Web Gallery of Art. February 16, 2011. <http://www.wga.hu/frames-e.html?/html/l/lorenzet/ambrogio/governme/1good1.html>
 Polzer, Joseph. "Ambrogio Lorenzetti's "War and Peace" Murals Revisited; Contributions to the Meaning of the "Good Government Allegory"" Artibus Et Historiae 23.45 (2002): 63-105.
 Rogers, Ray. Art: A World History. London, UK. 1998. 	
 Skinner, Quentin. "Ambrogio Lorenzetti's Buon Governo Frescoes: Two Old Questions, Two New Answers." Journal of the Warburg and Courtauld Institute 62 (1999): 1-28.
 Silvestri, Paolo, "After-word. Invisible Cities: Which (good-bad) man? For which (good-bad) polity?", in P. Heritier, P. Silvestri (eds.), Good government, Governance and Human Complexity. Luigi Einaudi's Legacy and Contemporary Society, Leo Olschki, Firenze, 2012, pp. 313–332. https://ideas.repec.org/p/pra/mprapa/59535.html

External links

 Effects of Good Government on the City Life
 Some Landscapes

1330s paintings
Paintings by Ambrogio Lorenzetti
Allegorical paintings by Italian artists
Paintings in the Palazzo Pubblico
Angels in art
Dance in art
Horses in art